David Hugh de Lautour (born 28 November 1982) is a New Zealand television actor. He was born in Christchurch, Canterbury, New Zealand and attended King's College, then The American Musical and Dramatic Academy (AMDA) to which he received a $50,000 scholarship.

Career

He has appeared in such television shows as Being Eve,  What I Like About You, Xena: Warrior Princess, NCIS: Los Angeles,
Legend of the Seeker, and Power Rangers Jungle Fury.

De Lautour started the production company Tool Shed Productions in 2006 which has produced a number of films, stage plays and his band, Four Tribe Native.

De Lautour did the voice and motion capture for Vergil in the 2013 video game DmC: Devil May Cry.

In 2014, he attended Power Morphicon 4, 22–24 August 2014 in Pasadena, California.

In 2015, he played the leading character Ted West in Westside a prequel television series to Outrageous Fortune.
Starting in 2019 he played Forensic Psychiatrist Greg Miller in the seventh season of Wentworth.

Filmography

Film

Television

Video games

References

External links
 Tool Shed Productions Website
 RJ fansite
 
 David de Lautour's music on MySpace
 Profile on Te Kete Ipurangi: The Online Learning Centre

 

1982 births
Living people
New Zealand male television actors
New Zealand male video game actors
New Zealand male voice actors
People educated at King's College, Auckland
People from Christchurch
20th-century New Zealand male actors
21st-century New Zealand male actors